The Chinese Communist Party (CCP), officially the Communist Party of China (CPC), is the founding and sole ruling party of the People's Republic of China (PRC). Under the leadership of Mao Zedong, the CCP emerged victorious in the Chinese Civil War against the Kuomintang, and, in 1949, Mao proclaimed the establishment of the People's Republic of China. Since then, the CCP has governed China with eight smaller parties within its united front and has sole control over the People's Liberation Army (PLA). Each successive leader of the CCP has added their own theories to the party's constitution, which outlines the ideological beliefs of the party, collectively referred to as socialism with Chinese characteristics. , the CCP has more than 96 million members, making it the second largest political party by party membership in the world after India's Bharatiya Janata Party. The Chinese public generally refers to the CCP as simply "the Party".

In 1921, Chen Duxiu and Li Dazhao led the founding of the CCP with the help of the Far Eastern Bureau of the Communist Party of the Soviet Union and Far Eastern Secretariat of the Communist International. For the first six years of its history, the CCP aligned itself with the Kuomintang (KMT) as the organized left wing of the larger nationalist movement. However, when the right wing of the KMT, led by Chiang Kai-shek, turned on the CCP and massacred tens of thousands of the party's members, the two parties split and began a prolonged civil war. During the next ten years of guerrilla warfare, Mao Zedong rose to become the most influential figure in the CCP, and the party established a strong base among the rural peasantry with its land reform policies. Support for the CCP continued to grow throughout the Second Sino-Japanese War, and after the Japanese surrender in 1945, the CCP emerged triumphant in the communist revolution against the KMT government. After the retreat of the KMT to Taiwan, the CCP established the People's Republic of China on 1 October 1949.

Mao Zedong continued to be the most influential member of the CCP until his death in 1976, although he periodically withdrew from public leadership as his health declined. Under Mao, the party completed its land reform program, launched a series of five-year plans, and eventually split with the Soviet Union. Although Mao attempted to purge the party of capitalist and reactionary elements during the Cultural Revolution, after his death, these policies were only briefly continued by the Gang of Four before a less radical faction seized control. During the 1980s, Deng Xiaoping directed the CCP away from Maoist orthodoxy and towards a policy of economic liberalization. The official explanation for these reforms was that China is still in the primary stage of socialism, a developmental stage similar to the capitalist mode of production. Since the collapse of the Eastern Bloc and the dissolution of the Soviet Union in 1991, the CCP has emphasized its relations with the ruling parties of the remaining socialist states and continues to participate in the International Meeting of Communist and Workers' Parties each year. The CCP has also established relations with several non-communist parties, including dominant nationalist parties of many developing countries in Africa, Asia and Latin America, as well as social democratic parties in Europe.

The Chinese Communist Party is organized on the basis of democratic centralism, a principle that entails open discussion of policy on the condition of unity among party members in upholding the agreed-upon decision. The highest body of the CCP is the National Congress, convened every fifth year. When the National Congress is not in session, the Central Committee is the highest body, but since that body usually only meets once a year, most duties and responsibilities are vested in the Politburo and its Standing Committee. Members of the latter are seen as the top leadership of the party and the state. Today the party's leader holds the offices of general secretary (responsible for civilian party duties), Chairman of the Central Military Commission (CMC) (responsible for military affairs), and State President (a largely ceremonial position). Because of these posts, the party leader is seen as the country's paramount leader. The current leader is Xi Jinping, who was elected at the 18th National Congress held on 8–15 November 2012 and retained his position at the 19th National Congress in 2017 and the 20th National Congress in 2022.

History

Founding and early history 
The CCP traces its origins to the May Fourth Movement of 1919, during which radical Western ideologies like Marxism and anarchism gained traction among Chinese intellectuals. Other influences stemming from the Bolshevik revolution and Marxist theory inspired the CCP. Chen Duxiu and Li Dazhao were among the first to publicly support Leninism and world revolution. Both regarded the October Revolution in Russia as groundbreaking, believing it to herald a new era for oppressed countries everywhere. Study circles were, according to Cai Hesen, "the rudiments [of our party]". Several study circles were established during the New Culture Movement, but by 1920 many grew sceptical about their ability to bring about reforms.

The CCP was founded on 1 July 1921 with the help of the Far Eastern Bureau of the Communist Party of the Soviet Union and Far Eastern Secretariat of the Communist International, according to the party's official account of its history. However, party documents suggest that the party's actual founding date was 23 July 1921, the first day of the 1st National Congress of the CCP. The founding National Congress of the CCP was held 23–31 July 1921. With only 50 members in the beginning of 1921, among them Chen Duxiu, Li Dazhao and Mao Zedong, the CCP organization and authorities grew tremendously. While it was originally held in a house in the Shanghai French Concession, French police interrupted the meeting on 30 July and the congress was moved to a tourist boat on South Lake in Jiaxing, Zhejiang province. A dozen delegates attended the congress, with neither Li nor Chen being able to attend, the latter sending a personal representative in his stead. The resolutions of the congress called for the establishment of a communist party as a branch of the Communist International (Comintern) and elected Chen as its leader. Chen then served as the first general secretary of the Communist Party and was referred to as "China's Lenin".

The Soviets hoped to foster pro-Soviet forces in East Asia to fight against anti-communist countries, particularly Japan. They attempted to contact the warlord Wu Peifu, but failed. The Soviets then contacted the Kuomintang (KMT), which was leading the Guangzhou government parallel to the Beiyang government. On 6 October 1923, the Comintern sent Mikhail Borodin to Guangzhou, and the Soviets established friendly relations with the KMT. The Central Committee of the CCP, Soviet leader Joseph Stalin, and the Comintern all hoped that the CCP would eventually control the KMT and called their opponents "rightists". KMT leader Sun Yat-sen eased the conflict between the communists and their opponents. CCP membership grew tremendously after the 4th congress in 1925, from 900 to 2,428. The CCP still treats Sun Yat-sen as one of the founders of their movement and claim descent from him as he is viewed as a proto-communist and the economic element of Sun's ideology was socialism. Sun stated, "Our Principle of Livelihood is a form of communism".

The communists dominated the left wing of the KMT and struggled for power with the party's right-wing factions. When Sun Yat-sen died in March 1925, he was succeeded by a rightist, Chiang Kai-shek, who initiated moves to marginalize the position of the communists. Chiang, Sun's former assistant, was not actively anti-communist at that time, even though he hated the theory of class struggle and the CCP's seizure of power. The communists proposed removing Chiang's power. When Chiang gradually gained the support of Western countries, the conflict between him and the communists became more and more intense. Chiang asked the Kuomintang to join the Comintern to rule out the secret expansion of communists within the KMT, while Chen Duxiu hoped that the communists would completely withdraw from the KMT.

In April 1927, both Chiang and the CCP were preparing for conflict. Fresh from the success of the Northern Expedition to overthrow the warlords, Chiang Kai-shek turned on the communists, who by now numbered in the tens of thousands across China. Ignoring the orders of the Wuhan-based KMT government, he marched on Shanghai, a city controlled by communist militias. Although the communists welcomed Chiang's arrival, he turned on them, massacring 5,000 with the aid of the Green Gang. Chiang's army then marched on Wuhan, but was prevented from taking the city by CCP General Ye Ting and his troops. Chiang's allies also attacked communists; for example, in Beijing, Li Dazhao and 19 other leading communists were executed by Zhang Zuolin. Angered by these events, the peasant movement supported by the CCP became more violent. Ye Dehui, a famous scholar, was killed by communists in Changsha, and in revenge, KMT general He Jian and his troops gunned down hundreds of peasant militiamen.

Chinese Civil War and Second Sino-Japanese War 

The CCP continued supporting the Wuhan KMT government, but on 15 July 1927 the Wuhan government expelled all communists from the KMT. The CCP reacted by founding the Workers' and Peasants' Red Army of China, better known as the "Red Army", to battle the KMT. A battalion led by General Zhu De was ordered to take the city of Nanchang on 1 August 1927 in what became known as the Nanchang uprising. Initially successful, Zhu and his troops were forced to retreat after five days, marching south to Shantou, and from there being driven into the wilderness of Fujian. Mao Zedong was appointed commander-in-chief of the Red Army, and led four regiments against Changsha in the Autumn Harvest Uprising, hoping to spark peasant uprisings across Hunan. His plan was to attack the KMT-held city from three directions on 9 September, but the Fourth Regiment deserted to the KMT cause, attacking the Third Regiment. Mao's army made it to Changsha but could not take it; by 15 September, he accepted defeat, with 1,000 survivors marching east to the Jinggang Mountains of Jiangxi.

The near-destruction of the CCP's urban organizational apparatus led to institutional changes within the party. The party adopted democratic centralism, a way to organize revolutionary parties, and established a politburo to function as the standing committee of the central committee. The result was increased centralization of power within the party. At every level of the party this was duplicated, with standing committees now in effective control. After being expelled from the party, Chen Duxiu went on to lead China's Trotskyist movement. Li Lisan was able to assume de facto control of the party organization by 1929–1930. Li's leadership was a failure, leaving the CCP on the brink of destruction. The Comintern became involved, and by late 1930, his powers had been taken away. By 1935 Mao had become a member of Politburo Standing Committee of the CCP and the party's informal military leader, with Zhou Enlai and Zhang Wentian, the formal head of the party, serving as his informal deputies. The conflict with the KMT led to the reorganization of the Red Army, with power now centralized in the leadership through the creation of CCP political departments charged with supervising the army.

The Xian Incident of December 1936 paused the conflict between the CCP and the KMT. Under pressure from Marshal Zhang Xueliang and the CCP, Chiang Kai-shek finally agreed to a Second United Front focused on repelling the Japanese invaders. While the front formally existed until 1945, all collaboration between the two parties had effectively ended by 1940. Despite their formal alliance, the CCP used the opportunity to expand and carve out independent bases of operations to prepare for the coming war with the KMT. In 1939 the KMT began to restrict CCP expansion within China. This led to frequent clashes between CCP and KMT forces which subsided rapidly on the realisation on both sides that civil war amidst a foreign invasion was not an option. By 1943, the CCP was again actively expanding its territory at the expense of the KMT.

Mao Zedong became the Chairman of the CCP in 1945. After the Japanese surrender in 1945, the war between the CCP and the KMT began again in earnest. The 1945-49 period had four stages; the first was from August 1945 (when the Japanese surrendered) to June 1946 (when the peace talks between the CCP and the KMT ended). By 1945, the KMT had three times more soldiers under its command than the CCP and initially appeared to be prevailing. With the cooperation of the U.S. and Japan, the KMT was able to retake major parts of the country. However, KMT rule over the reconquered territories proved unpopular because of its endemic political corruption. Notwithstanding its numerical superiority, the KMT failed to reconquer the rural territories which made up the CCP's stronghold. Around the same time, the CCP launched an invasion of Manchuria, where they were assisted by the Soviet Union. The second stage, lasting from July 1946 to June 1947, saw the KMT extend its control over major cities such as Yan'an, the CCP headquarters, for much of the war. The KMT's successes were hollow; the CCP had tactically withdrawn from the cities, and instead undermined KMT rule there by instigating protests amongst students and intellectuals. The KMT responded to these demonstrations with heavy-handed repression. In the meantime, the KMT was struggling with factional infighting and Chiang Kai-shek's autocratic control over the party, which weakened its ability to respond to attacks. The third stage, lasting from July 1947 to August 1948, saw a limited counteroffensive by the CCP. The objective was clearing "Central China, strengthening North China, and recovering Northeast China." This operation, coupled with military desertions from the KMT, resulted in the KMT losing 2 million of its 3 million troops by the spring of 1948, and saw a significant decline in support for KMT rule. The CCP was consequently able to cut off KMT garrisons in Manchuria and retake several territories. The last stage, lasting from September 1948 to December 1949, saw the communists go on the offensive and the collapse of KMT rule in mainland China as a whole. Mao's proclamation of the founding of the People's Republic of China on 1 October 1949 marked the end of the second phase of the Chinese Civil War (or the Chinese Communist Revolution, as it is called by the CCP).

Proclamation of the PRC and the 1950s 

Mao proclaimed the founding of the People's Republic of China (PRC) before a massive crowd at Tiananmen Square on 1 October 1949. The CCP headed the Central People's Government. From this time through the 1980s, top leaders of the CCP (such as Mao Zedong, Lin Biao, Zhou Enlai and Deng Xiaoping) were largely the same military leaders prior to the PRC's founding. As a result, informal personal ties between political and military leaders dominated civil-military relations.

Stalin proposed a one-party constitution when Liu Shaoqi visited the Soviet Union in 1952. The Constitution of the PRC in 1954 subsequently abolished the previous coalition government and established the CCP's one-party system. Mao said that China should implement a multi-party system under the CCP's leadership at the CCP's 8th Congress in 1956. He had not previously made such a proposal, but the CCP nonetheless retained most of its political power even after the announcement. In 1957, the CCP launched the Anti-Rightist Campaign against political dissidents and prominent figures from minor parties, which resulted in the political persecution of at least 550,000 people. The campaign significantly damaged the limited pluralistic nature in the socialist republic and solidified the country's status as a de facto one-party state.

The Anti-Rightist Campaign led to the catastrophic results of the Second Five Year Plan from 1958 to 1962, known as the Great Leap Forward. In an effort to transform the country from an agrarian economy into an industrialized one, the CCP collectivized farmland, formed people's communes, and diverted labour to factories. General mismanagement and exaggerations of harvests by CCP officials led to the Great Chinese Famine, which resulted in an estimated 15 to 45 million deaths, making it the largest famine in recorded history.

Sino-Soviet split and Cultural Revolution 

During the 1960s and 1970s, the CCP experienced a significant ideological separation from the Communist Party of the Soviet Union which was going through a period of "de-Stalinization" under Nikita Khrushchev. By that time, Mao had begun saying that the "continued revolution under the dictatorship of the proletariat" stipulated that class enemies continued to exist even though the socialist revolution seemed to be complete, leading to the Cultural Revolution in which millions were persecuted and killed. During the Cultural Revolution, party leaders such as Liu Shaoqi, Deng Xiaoping, Peng Dehuai, and He Long were purged or exiled, and the Gang of Four, led by Mao's wife Jiang Qing, emerged to fill in the power vacuum left behind.

Reforms under Deng Xiaoping 

Following Mao's death in 1976, a power struggle between CCP chairman Hua Guofeng and vice-chairman Deng Xiaoping erupted. Deng won the struggle, and became China's paramount leader in 1978. Deng, alongside Hu Yaobang and Zhao Ziyang, spearheaded the "reform and opening-up" policies, and introduced the ideological concept of socialism with Chinese characteristics, opening China to the world's markets. In reversing some of Mao's "leftist" policies, Deng argued that a socialist state could use the market economy without itself being capitalist. While asserting the political power of the CCP, the change in policy generated significant economic growth. This was justified on the basis that "Practice is the Sole Criterion for the Truth", a principle reinforced through a 1978 article that aimed to combat dogmatism and criticized the "Two Whatevers" policy. The new ideology, however, was contested on both sides of the spectrum, by Maoists to the left of the CCP's leadership, as well as by those supporting political liberalization. With other social factors, the conflicts culminated in the 1989 Tiananmen Square protests and massacre. The protests having been crushed and the reformist party general secretary Zhao Ziyang under house arrest, Deng's economic policies resumed and by the early 1990s the concept of a socialist market economy had been introduced. In 1997, Deng's beliefs (officially called "Deng Xiaoping Theory") were embedded into the CCP's constitution.

Further reforms under Jiang Zemin and Hu Jintao 
CCP general secretary Jiang Zemin succeeded Deng as paramount leader in the 1990s and continued most of his policies. In the 1990s, the CCP transformed from a veteran revolutionary leadership that was both leading militarily and politically, to a political elite increasingly renewed according to institutionalized norms in the civil bureaucracy. Leadership was largely selected based on rules and norms on promotion and retirement, educational background, and managerial and technical expertise. There is a largely separate group of professionalized military officers, serving under top CCP leadership largely through formal relationships within institutional channels.

As part of Jiang Zemin's nominal legacy, the CCP ratified the "Three Represents" for the 2003 revision of the party's constitution, as a "guiding ideology" to encourage the party to represent "advanced productive forces, the progressive course of China's culture, and the fundamental interests of the people." The theory legitimized the entry of private business owners and bourgeois elements into the party. Hu Jintao, Jiang Zemin's successor as general secretary, took office in 2002. Unlike Mao, Deng and Jiang Zemin, Hu laid emphasis on collective leadership and opposed one-man dominance of the political system. The insistence on focusing on economic growth led to a wide range of serious social problems. To address these, Hu introduced two main ideological concepts: the "Scientific Outlook on Development" and "Harmonious Socialist Society". Hu resigned from his post as CCP general secretary and Chairman of the CMC at the 18th National Congress held in 2012, and was succeeded in both posts by Xi Jinping.

Leadership of Xi Jinping 
Since taking power, Xi has initiated a wide-reaching anti-corruption campaign, while centralizing powers in the office of CCP general secretary at the expense of the collective leadership of prior decades. Commentators have described the campaign as a defining part of Xi's leadership as well as "the principal reason why he has been able to consolidate his power so quickly and effectively." Foreign commentators have likened him to Mao. Xi's leadership has also overseen an increase in the Party's role in China. Xi has added his ideology, named after himself, into the CCP constitution in 2017. As has been speculated, Xi Jinping did not retire from his top posts after serving for 10 years in 2022.

Since 2014, the CCP has led efforts in Xinjiang that involve the detention of more than 1 million Uyghurs and other ethnic minorities in internment camps, as well as other repressive measures. This has been described as a genocide by academics and some governments. On the other hand, a greater number of countries signed a letter penned to the Human Rights Council supporting the policies as an effort to combat terrorism in the region.

Celebrations of the 100th anniversary of the CCP's founding, one of the Two Centenaries, took place on 1 July 2021.

On July 6, 2021, Xi chaired the Communist Party of China and World Political Parties Summit, which involved representatives from 500 political parties across 160 countries. Xi urged the participants to oppose "technology blockades," and "developmental decoupling" in order to work towards "building a community with a shared future for mankind."

Ideology

Formal ideology 

The core ideology of the party has evolved with each distinct generation of Chinese leadership. As both the CCP and the People's Liberation Army promote their members according to seniority, it is possible to discern distinct generations of Chinese leadership. In official discourse, each group of leadership is identified with a distinct extension of the ideology of the party. Historians have studied various periods in the development of the government of the People's Republic of China by reference to these "generations".

Marxism–Leninism was the first official ideology of the CCP. According to the CCP, "Marxism–Leninism reveals the universal laws governing the development of history of human society." To the CCP, Marxism–Leninism provides a "vision of the contradictions in capitalist society and of the inevitability of a future socialist and communist societies". According to the People's Daily, Mao Zedong Thought "is Marxism–Leninism applied and developed in China". Mao Zedong Thought was conceived not only by Mao Zedong, but by leading party officials.

Deng Xiaoping Theory was added to the party constitution at the 14th National Congress in 1992. The concepts of "socialism with Chinese characteristics" and "the primary stage of socialism" were credited to the theory. Deng Xiaoping Theory can be defined as a belief that state socialism and state planning is not by definition communist, and that market mechanisms are class neutral. In addition, the party needs to react to the changing situation dynamically; to know if a certain policy is obsolete or not, the party had to "seek truth from facts" and follow the slogan "practice is the sole criterion for the truth". At the 14th National Congress, Jiang reiterated Deng's mantra that it was unnecessary to ask if something was socialist or capitalist, since the important factor was whether it worked.

The "Three Represents", Jiang Zemin's contribution to the party's ideology, was adopted by the party at the 16th National Congress. The Three Represents defines the role of the CCP, and stresses that the Party must always represent the requirements for developing China's advanced productive forces, the orientation of China's advanced culture and the fundamental interests of the overwhelming majority of the Chinese people." Certain segments within the CCP criticized the Three Represents as being un-Marxist and a betrayal of basic Marxist values. Supporters viewed it as a further development of socialism with Chinese characteristics. Jiang disagreed, and had concluded that attaining the communist mode of production, as formulated by earlier communists, was more complex than had been realized, and that it was useless to try to force a change in the mode of production, as it had to develop naturally, by following the economic laws of history. The theory is most notable for allowing capitalists, officially referred to as the "new social strata", to join the party on the grounds that they engaged in "honest labor and work" and through their labour contributed "to build[ing] socialism with Chinese characteristics."

In 2003 the 3rd Plenary Session of the 16th Central Committee conceived and formulated the ideology of the Scientific Outlook on Development (SOD). It is considered to be Hu Jintao's contribution to the official ideological discourse. The SOD incorporates scientific socialism, sustainable development, social welfare, a humanistic society, increased democracy, and, ultimately, the creation of a Socialist Harmonious Society. According to official statements by the CCP, the concept integrates "Marxism with the reality of contemporary China and with the underlying features of our times, and it fully embodies the Marxist worldview on and methodology for development."

Xi Jinping Thought on Socialism with Chinese Characteristics for a New Era, commonly known as Xi Jinping Thought, was added to the party constitution in the 19th National Congress in 2017. Xi himself has described the thought as part of the broad framework created around socialism with Chinese characteristics. In official party documentation and pronouncements by Xi's colleagues, the Thought is said to be a continuation of previous party ideologies as part of a series of guiding ideologies that embody "Marxism adapted to Chinese conditions" and contemporary considerations.

The party combines elements of both socialist patriotism and Chinese nationalism.

Economics 
Deng did not believe that the fundamental difference between the capitalist mode of production and the socialist mode of production was central planning versus free markets. He said, "A planned economy is not the definition of socialism, because there is planning under capitalism; the market economy happens under socialism, too. Planning and market forces are both ways of controlling economic activity". Jiang Zemin supported Deng's thinking, and stated in a party gathering that it did not matter if a certain mechanism was capitalist or socialist, because the only thing that mattered was whether it worked. It was at this gathering that Jiang Zemin introduced the term socialist market economy, which replaced Chen Yun's "planned socialist market economy". In his report to the 14th National Congress Jiang Zemin told the delegates that the socialist state would "let market forces play a basic role in resource allocation." Despite this, the 3rd Plenary Session of the 18th Central Committee upheld the creed "Maintain the dominance of the public sector and strengthen the economic vitality of the state-owned economy."

The CCP views the world as organized into two opposing camps; socialist and capitalist. They insist that socialism, on the basis of historical materialism, will eventually triumph over capitalism. In recent years, when the party has been asked to explain the capitalist globalization occurring, the party has returned to the writings of Karl Marx. Despite admitting that globalization developed through the capitalist system, the party's leaders and theorists argue that globalization is not intrinsically capitalist. The reason being that if globalization was purely capitalist, it would exclude an alternative socialist form of modernity. Globalization, as with the market economy, therefore does not have one specific class character (neither socialist nor capitalist) according to the party. The insistence that globalization is not fixed in nature comes from Deng's insistence that China can pursue socialist modernization by incorporating elements of capitalism. Because of this there is considerable optimism within the CCP that despite the current capitalist dominance of globalization, globalization can be turned into a vehicle supporting socialism.

Analysis and criticism 
While foreign analysts generally agree that the CCP has rejected orthodox Marxism–Leninism and Mao Zedong Thought (or at least basic thoughts within orthodox thinking), the CCP itself disagrees. Critics of the CCP argue that Jiang Zemin ended the party's formal commitment to Marxism–Leninism with the introduction of the ideological theory, the Three Represents. However, party theorist Leng Rong disagrees, claiming that "President Jiang rid the Party of the ideological obstacles to different kinds of ownership... He did not give up Marxism or socialism. He strengthened the Party by providing a modern understanding of Marxism and socialism—which is why we talk about a 'socialist market economy' with Chinese characteristics." The attainment of true "communism" is still described as the CCP's and China's "ultimate goal". While the CCP claims that China is in the primary stage of socialism, party theorists argue that the current development stage "looks a lot like capitalism". Alternatively, certain party theorists argue that "capitalism is the early or first stage of communism." Some have dismissed the concept of a primary stage of socialism as intellectual cynicism. For example, Robert Lawrence Kuhn, a former foreign adviser to the Chinese government, stated: "When I first heard this rationale, I thought it more comic than clever—a wry caricature of hack propagandists leaked by intellectual cynics. But the 100-year horizon comes from serious political theorists."

American political scientist and sinologist David Shambaugh argues that before the "Practice Is the Sole Criterion for the Truth" campaign, the relationship between ideology and decision making was a deductive one, meaning that policy-making was derived from ideological knowledge. However, under Deng's leadership this relationship was turned upside down, with decision making justifying ideology. Chinese policy-makers have described the Soviet Union's state ideology as "rigid, unimaginative, ossified, and disconnected from reality", believing that this was one of the reasons for the dissolution of the Soviet Union. Therefore, Shambaugh argues, Chinese policy-makers believe that their party ideology must be dynamic to safeguard the party's rule.

British sinologist Kerry Brown argues that the CCP does not have an ideology, and that the party organization is pragmatic and interested only in what works. The party itself argues against this assertion. Hu Jintao stated in 2012 that the Western world is "threatening to divide us" and that "the international culture of the West is strong while we are weak ... Ideological and cultural fields are our main targets". As such, the CCP puts a great deal of effort into the party schools and into crafting its ideological message.

Governance

Collective leadership 

Collective leadership, the idea that decisions will be taken through consensus, is the ideal in the CCP. The concept has its origins back to Lenin and the Russian Bolshevik Party. At the level of the central party leadership this means that, for instance, all members of the Politburo Standing Committee are of equal standing (each member having only one vote). A member of the Politburo Standing Committee often represents a sector; during Mao's reign, he controlled the People's Liberation Army, Kang Sheng, the security apparatus, and Zhou Enlai, the State Council and the Ministry of Foreign Affairs. This counts as informal power. Despite this, in a paradoxical relation, members of a body are ranked hierarchically (despite the fact that members are in theory equal to one another). Informally, the collective leadership is headed by a "leadership core"; that is, the paramount leader, the person who holds the offices of CCP general secretary, CMC chairman and PRC president. Before Jiang Zemin's tenure as paramount leader, the party core and collective leadership were indistinguishable. In practice, the core was not responsible to the collective leadership. However, by the time of Jiang, the party had begun propagating a responsibility system, referring to it in official pronouncements as the "core of the collective leadership".

Democratic centralism 

The CCP's organizational principle is democratic centralism, a principle that entails open discussion of policy on the condition of unity among party members in upholding the agreed-upon decision. It is based on two principles: democracy (synonymous in official discourse with "socialist democracy" and "inner-party democracy") and centralism. This has been the guiding organizational principle of the party since the 5th National Congress, held in 1927. In the words of the party constitution, "The Party is an integral body organized under its program and constitution and on the basis of democratic centralism". Mao once quipped that democratic centralism was "at once democratic and centralized, with the two seeming opposites of democracy and centralization united in a definite form." Mao claimed that the superiority of democratic centralism lay in its internal contradictions, between democracy and centralism, and freedom and discipline. Currently, the CCP is claiming that "democracy is the lifeline of the Party, the lifeline of socialism". But for democracy to be implemented, and functioning properly, there needs to be centralization. The goal of democratic centralism was not to obliterate capitalism or its policies but instead it is the movement towards regulating capitalism while involving socialism and democracy. Democracy in any form, the CCP claims, needs centralism, since without centralism there will be no order.

Shuanggui 

Shuanggui is an intra-party disciplinary process conducted by the Central Commission for Discipline Inspection (CCDI). This formally independent internal control institution conducts shuanggui on members accused of "disciplinary violations", a charge which generally refers to political corruption. The process, which literally translates to "double regulation", aims to extract confessions from members accused of violating party rules. According to the Dui Hua Foundation, tactics such as cigarette burns, beatings and simulated drowning are among those used to extract confessions. Other reported techniques include the use of induced hallucinations, with one subject of this method reporting that "In the end I was so exhausted, I agreed to all the accusations against me even though they were false."

United front

The CCP employs a political strategy that it terms "united front work" that involves groups and key individuals that are influenced or controlled by the CCP and used to advance its interests. United front work is managed primarily but not exclusively by the United Front Work Department (UFWD). The united front has historically been a popular front that has included eight legally-permitted political parties alongside other people's organizations which have nominal representation in the National People's Congress and the Chinese People's Political Consultative Conference (CPPCC). However, the CPPCC is a body without real power. While consultation does take place, it is supervised and directed by the CCP. Under Xi Jinping, the united front and its targets of influence have expanded in size and scope.

Organization

Central organization

The National Congress is the party's highest body, and, since the 9th National Congress in 1969, has been convened every five years (prior to the 9th Congress they were convened on an irregular basis). According to the party's constitution, a congress may not be postponed except "under extraordinary circumstances." The party constitution gives the National Congress six responsibilities:
 electing the Central Committee;
 electing the Central Commission for Discipline Inspection (CCDI);
 examining the report of the outgoing Central Committee;
 examining the report of the outgoing CCDI;
 discussing and enacting party policies; and,
 revising the party's constitution.

In practice, the delegates rarely discuss issues at length at the National Congresses. Most substantive discussion takes place before the congress, in the preparation period, among a group of top party leaders. In between National Congresses, the Central Committee is the highest decision-making institution. The CCDI is responsible for supervising party's internal anti-corruption and ethics system. In between congresses the CCDI is under the authority of the Central Committee.

The Central Committee, as the party's highest decision-making institution between national congresses, elects several bodies to carry out its work. The first plenary session of a newly elected central committee elects the general secretary of the Central Committee, the party's leader; the Central Military Commission (CMC); the Politburo; the Politburo Standing Committee (PSC); and since 2013, the Central National Security Commission (CNSC). The first plenum also endorses the composition of the Secretariat and the leadership of the CCDI. According to the party constitution, the general secretary must be a member of the Politburo Standing Committee (PSC), and is responsible for convening meetings of the PSC and the Politburo, while also presiding over the work of the Secretariat. The Politburo "exercises the functions and powers of the Central Committee when a plenum is not in session". The PSC is the party's highest decision-making institution when the Politburo, the Central Committee and the National Congress are not in session. It convenes at least once a week. It was established at the 8th National Congress, in 1958, to take over the policy-making role formerly assumed by the Secretariat. The Secretariat is the top implementation body of the Central Committee, and can make decisions within the policy framework established by the Politburo; it is also responsible for supervising the work of organizations that report directly into the Central Committee, for example departments, commissions, publications, and so on. The CMC is the highest decision-making institution on military affairs within the party, and controls the operations of the People's Liberation Army. The general secretary has, since Jiang Zemin, also served as Chairman of the CMC. Unlike the collective leadership ideal of other party organs, the CMC chairman acts as commander-in-chief with full authority to appoint or dismiss top military officers at will. The CNSC "co-ordinates security strategies across various departments, including intelligence, the military, foreign affairs and the police in order to cope with growing challenges to stability at home and abroad." The general secretary serves as the Chairman of the CNSC.

A first plenum of the Central Committee also elects heads of departments, bureaus, central leading groups and other institutions to pursue its work during a term (a "term" being the period elapsing between national congresses, usually five years). The General Office is the party's "nerve centre", in charge of day-to-day administrative work, including communications, protocol, and setting agendas for meetings. The CCP currently has four main central departments: the Organization Department, responsible for overseeing provincial appointments and vetting cadres for future appointments, the Publicity Department (formerly "Propaganda Department"), which oversees the media and formulates the party line to the media, the International Department, functioning as the party's "foreign affairs ministry" with other parties, and the United Front Work Department, which oversees work with the country's non-communist parties, mass organizations, and influence groups outside of the country. The CC also has direct control over the Central Policy Research Office, which is responsible for researching issues of significant interest to the party leadership, the Central Party School, which provides political training and ideological indoctrination in communist thought for high-ranking and rising cadres, the Party History Research Centre, which sets priorities for scholarly research in state-run universities and the Central Party School, and the Compilation and Translation Bureau, which studies and translates the classical works of Marxism. The party's newspaper, the People's Daily, is under the direct control of the Central Committee and is published with the objectives "to tell good stories about China and the (Party)" and to promote its party leader. The theoretical magazines Seeking Truth from Facts and Study Times are published by the Central Party School. The China Media Group, which oversees China Central Television (CCTV), China National Radio (CNR) and China Radio International (CRI), is under the direct control of the Publicity Department. The various offices of the "Central Leading Groups", such as the Hong Kong and Macau Affairs Office, the Taiwan Affairs Office, and the Central Finance Office, also report to the central committee during a plenary session. Additionally, CCP has sole control over the People's Liberation Army (PLA) through its Central Military Commission.

Lower-level organizations
After seizing political power, the CCP extended the dual party-state command system to all government institutions, social organizations, and economic entities. The State Council and the Supreme Court each has a party core group (党组), established since November 1949. Party committees permeate in every state administrative organ as well as the People's Consultation Conferences and mass organizations at all levels. Party committees exist inside of companies, both private and state-owned. Modelled after the Soviet Nomenklatura system, the party committee's organization department at each level has the power to recruit, train, monitor, appoint, and relocate these officials.

Party committees exist at the level of provinces, cities, counties, and neighbourhoods. These committees play a key role in directing local policy by selecting local leaders and assigning critical tasks. The Party secretary at each level is more senior than that of the leader of the government, with the CCP standing committee being the main source of power. Party committee members in each level are selected by the leadership in the level above, with provincial leaders selected by the central Organizational Department, and not removable by the local party secretary.

In theory, however, party committees are elected by party congresses at their own level. Local party congresses are supposed to be held every fifth year, but under extraordinary circumstances they may be held earlier or postponed. However that decision must be approved by the next higher level of the local party committee. The number of delegates and the procedures for their election are decided by the local party committee, but must also have the approval of the next higher party committee.

A local party congress has many of the same duties as the National Congress, and it is responsible for examining the report of the local Party Committee at the corresponding level; examining the report of the local Commission for Discipline Inspection at the corresponding level; discussing and adopting resolutions on major issues in the given area; and electing the local Party Committee and the local Commission for Discipline Inspection at the corresponding level. Party committees of "a province, autonomous region, municipality directly under the central government, city divided into districts, or autonomous prefecture [are] elected for a term of five years", and include full and alternate members. The party committees "of a county (banner), autonomous county, city not divided into districts, or municipal district [are] elected for a term of five years", but full and alternate members "must have a Party standing of three years or more." If a local Party Congress is held before or after the given date, the term of the members of the Party Committee shall be correspondingly shortened or lengthened.

Vacancies in a Party Committee shall be filled by an alternate members according to the order of precedence, which is decided by the number of votes an alternate member got during his or hers election. A Party Committee must convene for at least two plenary meetings a year. During its tenure, a Party Committee shall "carry out the directives of the next higher Party organizations and the resolutions of the Party congresses at the corresponding levels." The local Standing Committee (analogous to the Central Politburo) is elected at the first plenum of the corresponding Party Committee after the local party congress. A Standing Committee is responsible to the Party Committee at the corresponding level and the Party Committee at the next higher level. A Standing Committee exercises the duties and responsibilities of the corresponding Party Committee when it is not in session.

Funding 
The funding of all CCP organizations mainly comes from state fiscal revenue. Data for the proportion of total CCP organizations’ expenditures in total China fiscal revenue is unavailable. However, occasionally small local governments in China release such data. For example, on 10 October 2016, the local government of Mengmao Township, Ruili City, Yunnan Province released a concise fiscal revenue and expenditure report for the year 2014. According to this report, the fiscal Revenue amounted to RMB 29,498,933.58, and CCP organization' expenditures amounted to RMB 1,660,115.50, that is, 5.63% of fiscal revenue is used by the CCP for its own operation. This value is similar to the social security and employment expenditure of the whole town—RMB 1,683,064.90.

Members 

The CCP reached 96.71 million members at the end of 2021. It is the second largest political party in the world after India's Bharatiya Janata Party.

To join the CCP, an applicant must go through an approval process. In 2014, only 2 million applications were accepted out of some 22 million applicants. Admitted members then spend a year as a probationary member.

In contrast to the past, when emphasis was placed on the applicants' ideological criteria, the current CCP stresses technical and educational qualifications. To become a probationary member, the applicant must take an admission oath before the party flag. The relevant CCP organization is responsible for observing and educating probationary members. Probationary members have duties similar to those of full members, with the exception that they may not vote in party elections nor stand for election. Many join the CCP through the Communist Youth League. Under Jiang Zemin, private entrepreneurs were allowed to become party members. According to the CCP constitution, a member, in short, must follow orders, be disciplined, uphold unity, serve the Party and the people, and promote the socialist way of life. Members enjoy the privilege of attending Party meetings, reading relevant Party documents, receiving Party education, participating in Party discussions through the Party's newspapers and journals, making suggestions and proposal, making "well-grounded criticism of any Party organization or member at Party meetings" (even of the central party leadership), voting and standing for election, and of opposing and criticizing Party resolutions ("provided that they resolutely carry out the resolution or policy while it is in force"); and they have the ability "to put forward any request, appeal, or complaint to higher Party organizations, even up to the Central Committee, and ask the organizations concerned for a responsible reply." No party organization, including the CCP central leadership, can deprive a member of these rights.

As of 30 June 2016, individuals who identify as farmers, herdsmen and fishermen make up 26 million members; members identifying as workers totalled 7.2 million. Another group, the "Managing, professional and technical staff in enterprises and public institutions", made up 12.5 million, 9 million identified as working in administrative staff and 7.4 million described themselves as party cadres.

As of 2021, CCP membership had become more educated, younger, and less blue-collar than previously. , around 30-35% of Chinese entrepreneurs have been Party members.

28.43 million women are CCP members (less than a third of the party). Women in China have low participation rates as political leaders. Women's disadvantage is most evident in their severe under representation in the more powerful political positions. At the top level of decision making, no woman has ever been among the nine members of the Standing Committee of the Communist Party's Politburo. Just 3 of 27 government ministers are women, and importantly, since 1997, China has fallen to 53rd place from 16th in the world in terms of female representation at its parliament, the National People's Congress, according to the Inter-Parliamentary Union. Party leaders such as Zhao Ziyang have vigorously opposed the participation of women in the political process. Within the party women face a glass ceiling.

Communist Youth League

The Communist Youth League (CYL) is the CCP's youth wing, and the largest mass organization for youth in China. According to the CCP's constitution the CYL is a "mass organization of advanced young people under the leadership of the Communist Party of China; it functions as a party school where a large number of young people learn about socialism with Chinese characteristics and about communism through practice; it is the Party's assistant and reserve force." To join, an applicant has to be between the ages of 14 and 28. It controls and supervises Young Pioneers, a youth organization for children below the age of 14. However, the Central Committee (and all central organs) of the CYL work under the guidance of the CCP central leadership. Therefore, in a peculiar situation, CYL bodies are both responsible to higher bodies within CYL and the CCP, a distinct organization. As of the 17th National Congress (held in 2013), CYL had 89 million members.

Symbols 

At the beginning of its history, the CCP did not have a single official standard for the flag, but instead allowed individual party committees to copy the flag of the Communist Party of the Soviet Union. The Central Politburo decreed the establishment of a sole official flag on 28 April 1942: "The flag of the CPC has the length-to-width proportion of 3:2 with a hammer and sickle in the upper-left corner, and with no five-pointed star. The Political Bureau authorizes the General Office to custom-make a number of standard flags and distribute them to all major organs".

According to People's Daily, "The standard party flag is 120 centimeters (cm) in length and 80 cm in width. In the center of the upper-left corner (a quarter of the length and width to the border) is a yellow hammer-and-sickle 30 cm in diameter. The flag sleeve (pole hem) is in white and 6.5 cm in width. The dimension of the pole hem is not included in the measure of the flag. The red color symbolizes revolution; the hammer-and-sickle are tools of workers and peasants, meaning that the Communist Party of China represents the interests of the masses and the people; the yellow color signifies brightness." In total the flag has five dimensions, the sizes are "no. 1: 388 cm in length and 192 cm in width; no. 2: 240 cm in length and 160 cm in width; no. 3: 192 cm in length and 128 cm in width; no. 4: 144 cm in length and 96 cm in width; no. 5: 96 cm in length and 64 cm in width."

On 21 September 1966, the CCP General Office issued the "Regulations on the Production and Use of the CPC Flag and Emblem", which stated that the emblem and flag were the official symbols and signs of the party. Article 53 of the CCP constitution states that "the Party emblem and flag are the symbol and sign of the Communist Party of China."

Party-to-party relations 
The International Liaison Department of the CCP is responsible for dialogue with global political parties.

Communist parties 

The CCP continues to have relations with non-ruling communist and workers' parties and attends international communist conferences, most notably the International Meeting of Communist and Workers' Parties. While the CCP retains contact with major parties such as the Communist Party of Portugal, the Communist Party of France, the Communist Party of the Russian Federation, the Communist Party of Bohemia and Moravia, the Communist Party of Brazil, the Communist Party of Greece, the Communist Party of Nepal and the Communist Party of Spain, the party also retains relations with minor communist and workers' parties, such as the Communist Party of Australia, the Workers Party of Bangladesh, the Communist Party of Bangladesh (Marxist–Leninist) (Barua), the Communist Party of Sri Lanka, the Workers' Party of Belgium, the Hungarian Workers' Party, the Dominican Workers' Party, the Nepal Workers Peasants Party, and the Party for the Transformation of Honduras, for instance. In recent years, noting the self-reform of the European social democratic movement in the 1980s and 1990s, the CCP "has noted the increased marginalization of West European communist parties."

Ruling parties of socialist states 
The CCP has retained close relations with the ruling parties of socialist states still espousing communism: Cuba, Laos, North Korea, and Vietnam. It spends a fair amount of time analysing the situation in the remaining socialist states, trying to reach conclusions as to why these states survived when so many did not, following the collapse of the Eastern European socialist states in 1989 and the dissolution of the Soviet Union in 1991. In general, the analyses of the remaining socialist states and their chances of survival have been positive, and the CCP believes that the socialist movement will be revitalized sometime in the future.

The ruling party which the CCP is most interested in is the Communist Party of Vietnam (CPV). In general the CPV is considered a model example of socialist development in the post-Soviet era. Chinese analysts on Vietnam believe that the introduction of the Doi Moi reform policy at the 6th CPV National Congress is the key reason for Vietnam's current success.

While the CCP is probably the organization with most access to North Korea, writing about North Korea is tightly circumscribed. The few reports accessible to the general public are those about North Korean economic reforms. While Chinese analysts of North Korea tend to speak positively of North Korea in public, in official discussions circa 2008 they show much disdain for North Korea's economic system, the cult of personality which pervades society, the Kim family, the idea of hereditary succession in a socialist state, the security state, the use of scarce resources on the Korean People's Army and the general impoverishment of the North Korean people. Circa 2008, there are those analysts who compare the current situation of North Korea with that of China during the Cultural Revolution. Over the years, the CCP has tried to persuade the Workers' Party of Korea (or WPK, North Korea's ruling party) to introduce economic reforms by showing them key economic infrastructure in China. For instance, in 2006 the CCP invited then-WPK general secretary Kim Jong-il to Guangdong to showcase the success economic reforms had brought China. In general, the CCP considers the WPK and North Korea to be negative examples of a ruling communist party and socialist state.

There is a considerable degree of interest in Cuba within the CCP. Fidel Castro, the former First Secretary of the Communist Party of Cuba (PCC), is greatly admired, and books have been written focusing on the successes of the Cuban Revolution. Communication between the CCP and the PCC has increased since the 1990s. At the 4th Plenary Session of the 16th Central Committee, which discussed the possibility of the CCP learning from other ruling parties, praise was heaped on the PCC. When Wu Guanzheng, a Central Politburo member, met with Fidel Castro in 2007, he gave him a personal letter written by Hu Jintao: "Facts have shown that China and Cuba are trustworthy good friends, good comrades, and good brothers who treat each other with sincerity. The two countries' friendship has withstood the test of a changeable international situation, and the friendship has been further strengthened and consolidated."

Non-communist parties 
Since the decline and fall of communism in Eastern Europe, the CCP has begun establishing party-to-party relations with non-communist parties. These relations are sought so that the CCP can learn from them. For instance, the CCP has been eager to understand how the People's Action Party of Singapore (PAP) maintains its total domination over Singaporean politics through its "low-key presence, but total control." According to the CCP's own analysis of Singapore, the PAP's dominance can be explained by its "well-developed social network, which controls constituencies effectively by extending its tentacles deeply into society through branches of government and party-controlled groups." While the CCP accepts that Singapore is a liberal democracy, they view it as a guided democracy led by the PAP. Other differences are, according to the CCP, "that it is not a political party based on the working class—instead it is a political party of the elite.... It is also a political party of the parliamentary system, not a revolutionary party." Other parties which the CCP studies and maintains strong party-to-party relations with are the United Malays National Organization, which has ruled Malaysia (1957–2018, 2020–present), and the Liberal Democratic Party in Japan, which dominated Japanese politics since 1955.

Since Jiang Zemin's time, the CCP has made friendly overtures to its erstwhile foe, the Kuomintang. The CCP emphasizes strong party-to-party relations with the KMT so as to strengthen the probability of the reunification of Taiwan with mainland China. However, several studies have been written on the KMT's loss of power in 2000 after having ruled Taiwan since 1949 (the KMT officially ruled mainland China from 1928 to 1949). In general, one-party states or dominant-party states are of special interest to the party and party-to-party relations are formed so that the CCP can study them. The longevity of the Syrian Regional Branch of the Arab Socialist Ba'ath Party is attributed to the personalization of power in the al-Assad family, the strong presidential system, the inheritance of power, which passed from Hafez al-Assad to his son Bashar al-Assad, and the role given to the Syrian military in politics.

Circa 2008, the CCP has been especially interested in Latin America, as shown by the increasing number of delegates sent to and received from these countries. Of special fascination for the CCP is the 71-year-long rule of the Institutional Revolutionary Party (PRI) in Mexico. While the CCP attributed the PRI's long reign in power to the strong presidential system, tapping into the machismo culture of the country, its nationalist posture, its close identification with the rural populace and the implementation of nationalization alongside the marketization of the economy, the CCP concluded that the PRI failed because of the lack of inner-party democracy, its pursuit of social democracy, its rigid party structures that could not be reformed, its political corruption, the pressure of globalization, and American interference in Mexican politics. While the CCP was slow to recognize the pink tide in Latin America, it has strengthened party-to-party relations with several socialist and anti-American political parties over the years. The CCP has occasionally expressed some irritation over Hugo Chávez's anti-capitalist and anti-American rhetoric. Despite this, the CCP reached an agreement in 2013 with the United Socialist Party of Venezuela (PSUV), which was founded by Chávez, for the CCP to educate PSUV cadres in political and social fields. By 2008, the CCP claimed to have established relations with 99 political parties in 29 Latin American countries.

Social democratic movements in Europe have been of great interest to the CCP since the early 1980s. With the exception of a short period in which the CCP forged party-to-party relations with far-right parties during the 1970s in an effort to halt "Soviet expansionism", the CCP's relations with European social democratic parties were its first serious efforts to establish cordial party-to-party relations with non-communist parties. The CCP credits the European social democrats with creating a "capitalism with a human face". Before the 1980s, the CCP had a highly negative and dismissive view of social democracy, a view dating back to the Second International and the Marxist–Leninist view on the social democratic movement. By the 1980s, that view had changed and the CCP concluded that it could actually learn something from the social democratic movement. CCP delegates were sent all over Europe to observe. By the 1980s, most European social democratic parties were facing electoral decline and in a period of self-reform. The CCP followed this with great interest, laying most weight on reform efforts within the British Labour Party and the Social Democratic Party of Germany. The CCP concluded that both parties were re-elected because they modernized, replacing traditional state socialist tenets with new ones supporting privatization, shedding the belief in big government, conceiving a new view of the welfare state, changing their negative views of the market and moving from their traditional support base of trade unions to entrepreneurs, the young and students.

Electoral history

National People's Congress elections

See also 

 List of Chinese Communist Party members
 Politics of the People's Republic of China
 Succession of power in the People's Republic of China

Notes

References

Citations

Sources

Books 

 
 
 
 
 
 
 
 
 
 
 
 
 
 
 
 
 
 
 
 
 
 
 
 
 
 
 
 
 
 
 
 
 
 
 
 
 
 
 
 Saich, Tony. From Rebel to Ruler: One Hundred Years of the Chinese Communist Party (2021)
 Saich, Tony. Finding Allies and Making Revolution The Early Years of the Chinese Communist Party (2020)
 Saich, Tony. Governance and Politics of China  (2015)

Journal articles

External links 

 

 
Communist parties in China
Ruling communist parties
People's Republic of China
Political parties established in 1921
Political parties in the Republic of China
Chinese Civil War
Maoist parties
Marxist parties in China 
Government of China
1921 establishments in China
Parties of one-party systems
Chinese nationalist political parties